KeyPoint Federal Credit Union was a credit union headquartered in Baton Rouge, Louisiana and chartered and regulated under the authority of the National Credit Union Administration). Like all credit unions, KeyPoint Federal is owned by its membership, governed by a Board of volunteers, elected by and from the membership.

KeyPoint Federal Credit Union was founded as COPO Federal Credit Union in 1955 by a small group of committed and concerned employees of the Copolymer Rubber & Chemical Corporation, which later became DSM Copolymer.  In 2003, COPO received a community charter from the national administration giving them the ability to open their membership to anyone who lives, works, worships, attends school in or is a business entity in East Baton Rouge, West Baton Rouge, Livingston, and Ascension Parishes (Louisiana) Since then, the credit union has grown to serve over 7,500 members and handle finances totaling over $400 million.

KeyPoint was noted as being the first credit union in the Baton Rouge area to obtain a community charter, and was quickly followed by many others in the region.

In 2006, KeyPoint approved a $409,891.98 loan to Keryn Goynes, who later pleaded guilty to charges of making a false statement to a credit union.

As of 2012, KeyPoint Federal Credit Union was merged with and is now known as Neighbors Federal Credit Union.

References

External links
Keypoint Federal Credit Union website
Keypoint Credit Union asset statistics
Keypoint Federal Credit Union blog

Banks established in 1955
Credit unions based in Louisiana
Companies based in Baton Rouge, Louisiana
1955 establishments in Louisiana